Mārtiņš Rubenis (born 26 September 1978) is a retired Latvian luger who competed between 1998 and 2014. He won the bronze medal at the men's singles event at the 2006 Winter Olympics in Turin, becoming the first Latvian (i.e. representing Republic of Latvia, as opposed to the Soviet Union) to win a medal at the Winter Olympics and the only one fr He won his second bronze medal at the 2014 Winter Olympics in Sochi in the Team Relay event. In total he competed in five Olympics.

Rubenis has also won the gold medal at the 1998 World Junior Championships, as well as the silver and bronze medals at the 2003 and 2004 World Championships respectively. He also won three medals in the Team Relay event at the FIL European Luge Championships with a golds in 2008 and 2010, and a bronze in 2006.

Rubenis retired after the 2014 Winter Olympics. He announced his retirement after the men's event, in which he finished 10th, yet a few days later Rubenis won a bronze medal being a part of the Latvian Relay Team. As a result, he and his team-mates in the relay squad were featured on a commemorative stamp issued by Latvian Post. Following his retirement, he was appointed as coach of the Latvian national luge team, and additionally uses his skills as a mechanical engineer to design sleds for the team, having already made his own sleds whilst competing. He also became a member of the Latvian Olympic Committee, having previously served as an athlete representative to the International Luge Federation.

Rubenis is a musician and DJ and a member of the DJs group Värka Kru.

Awards

 2011 – The Three – Star Order
 2014 – The Cross of Recognition

Achievements
 1998 – 1st place in World Junior championship
 2000 – 11th place in World championship
 2000 – 18th place Overall World Cup
 2001 – 29th place in World championship
 2001 – 25th place Overall World Cup
 2002 – 15th place in European championship
 2002 – 34th place Overall World Cup
 2003 – 2nd place in World championship – team competition
 2003 – 2nd place in World championship
 2003 – 18th place Overall World Cup
 2004 – 3rd place in World championship
 2004 – 13th place Overall World Cup
 2004 – 12th place Overall Challenge Cup
 2005 – 11th place in World championship
 2005 – 11th place Overall World Cup
 2005 – 9th place Overall Challenge Cup
 2006 – 3rd place in European championship – team competition
 2006 – 7th place in European championship

Olympic Games results
 1998 – Nagano 14th place
 2002 – Salt Lake City after crash – DNF
 2006 – Torino 3rd place
 2010 – Vancouver 11th place
 2014 – Sochi 10th place
 2014 – Sochi 3rd place Team Relay

References

 
FIL-Luge profile

External links

 
 
 
 

1978 births
Living people
Latvian male lugers
Olympic lugers of Latvia
Olympic medalists in luge
Olympic bronze medalists for Latvia
Lugers at the 1998 Winter Olympics
Lugers at the 2002 Winter Olympics
Lugers at the 2006 Winter Olympics
Lugers at the 2010 Winter Olympics
Lugers at the 2014 Winter Olympics
Medalists at the 2006 Winter Olympics
Medalists at the 2014 Winter Olympics
Sportspeople from Riga
Recipients of the Cross of Recognition
Latvian sports coaches
Mechanical engineers
Falun Gong practitioners